The Roaring River is a river of Jamaica.

The Roaring River Park is a tourist attraction at a former plantation on the river.

References

References
 GEOnet Names Server
OMC Map
CIA Map
Ford, Jos C. and Finlay, A.A.C. (1908).The Handbook of Jamaica. Jamaica Government Printing Office

Rivers of Jamaica